Ernst Csiki, Ernst Dietl or Ernő Csiki (Csíki) (22 October 1875 in Vulkan – 7 July 1954 in Budapest) was a Hungarian entomologist who specialised in Coleoptera.

Born as Ernst Dietl at Zsilvajdejvulka, Hunyad County, Transylvania today known as Vulcan in Romania, he went to study at the veterinary college in Budapest and graduated in 1897. He then joined the Hungarian Natural History Museum and worked as an assistant curator. In 1898 he changed his name to Hungarian as Csiki. He retired in 1933 as director but continued to work in entomology. He received a doctorate in 1953. 

At the time of Ernő Csiki's retirement (1932) the beetle collection contained over 1 million specimens largely due to his purchases and his obtaining funding for expeditions. Csiki wrote several parts of Coleopterorum Catalogus and many papers on Carpathian Coleoptera.

A street in Budapest where he lived is called as Bogár utca (beetle street) in his honour.

References

External links 
 DEI biografi Obituaries, Portrait.
Hungarian Entomological Society (in Hungarian)

1875 births
1954 deaths
People from Vulcan, Hunedoara
Hungarian entomologists
Entomologists from the Austro-Hungarian Empire